Kevin Young (born July 16, 1982) is a Canadian former professional ice hockey defenceman.

Playing career
A native of White Rock, British Columbia, Young spent five seasons of major junior hockey in the Western Hockey League and the Ontario Hockey League. He then went to play CIS hockey with the University of New Brunswick, where in his rookie season he was recognized for his outstanding play when he was awarded the 2004 Clare Drake Award as the CIS Rookie of the Year.

Prior to moving to college, Don Cherry was quoted as saying," Kevin Young is the greatest prospect to come from the Semiahmoo Minor Hockey Association in recent history."

As a professional, Young has played in both North America and Europe, with locations including the Netherlands, Great Britain, Germany, and France.

During the 2012–13 season Young played in the Central Hockey League (CHL) with the Wichita Thunder where he scored 24 goals and 35 assists for 59 points, and was named the CHL's Most Outstanding Defenceman.

On August 29, 2013, the Colorado Eagles of the ECHL signed Young for the 2013–14 season. In 56 games with the Eagles, Young produced 6 goals and 35 points from the blueline before suffering a first round defeat in the playoffs.

On June 12, 2014, Young opted to sign a one-year contract with the Allen Americans of the ECHL. In the 2014–15 season, Young contributed with 8 goals and 44 points from the blueline, ranking 8th in the league amongst defenseman and later helped the American capture their first Kelly Cup Championship.

In the following 2015–16 season, Young was traded after 3 games with the Americans to the Reading Royals in exchange for Jonathan Parker on October 19, 2015.

Career statistics

Awards and honours

References

External links

1982 births
Allen Americans players
Bossier-Shreveport Mudbugs players
Brampton Battalion players
Canadian ice hockey defencemen
Colorado Eagles players
ETC Crimmitschau players
Étoile Noire de Strasbourg players
EV Landsberg players
Hull Stingrays players
Kelowna Rockets players
Kemphanen Eindhoven players
Lausitzer Füchse players
Living people
Medicine Hat Tigers players
New Brunswick Varsity Reds ice hockey players
Nijmegen Devils players
Portland Winterhawks players
Reading Royals players
Worcester Sharks players
Wichita Thunder players
Canadian expatriate ice hockey players in England
Canadian expatriate ice hockey players in the Netherlands
Canadian expatriate ice hockey players in Germany